The Ulmener Maar is a maar in the Eifel mountains of Germany in the immediate vicinity of the town of Ulmen in the state of Rhineland-Palatinate. The lake is up to 37 metres deep and is surrounded by an embankment of tuff with an average height of 20 metres, which was formed from the erupted material of the former volcano. By the southern edge of the embankment are the ruins of a knight's castle, Ulmen Castle dating to the 11th century.

IUGS geological heritage site
In respect of it being the 'youngest volcano in central Europe, situated in Vulkaneifel, the volcanic region where the model of formation of maars by phreatomagmatic eruptions was established', the International Union of Geological Sciences (IUGS) included 'The Holocene Ulmen Maar' in its assemblage of 100 'geological heritage sites' around the world in a listing published in October 2022. The organisation defines an IUGS Geological Heritage Site as 'a key place with geological elements and/or processes of international scientific relevance, used as a reference, and/or with a substantial contribution to the development of geological sciences through history.'

See also 
 List of lakes in Germany
 List of volcanoes in Germany

Literature 
 Werner D’hein: Natur- und Kulturführer Vulkanlandeifel. Mit 26 Stationen der „Deutschen Vulkanstraße“. Gaasterland-Verlag, Düsseldorf, 2006, .

References and footnotes

External links 
 
 Bilder zum Ulmener Maar

Maars of the Eifel
Lakes of Rhineland-Palatinate
Cochem-Zell
First 100 IUGS Geological Heritage Sites